Fibulin-2 is a protein that in humans is encoded by the FBLN2 gene.

This gene encodes an extracellular matrix protein, which belongs to the fibulin family. This protein binds various extracellular ligands and calcium. It may play a role during organ development, in particular, during the differentiation of heart, skeletal and neuronal structures. Alternatively spliced transcript variants encoding different isoforms have been identified.

Its role as a biomarker for meningiomas (a common tumour affecting the central nervous system) was recently described where a blood test can predict whether patients have a grade II meningiomas (poor outcome) and not a grade I meningioma (better outcome), without the need for a surgical biopsy.

Interactions
FBLN2 has been shown to interact with Laminin, alpha 1, Laminin, alpha 5 and Perlecan.

References

Further reading